The Divine Punishment is the third album by American avant-garde artist Diamanda Galás, released on June 30, 1986 by record label Mute.

Content 

The Divine Punishment is the first instalment of her "Masque of the Red Death" trilogy about the AIDS epidemic. In this instalment, she focuses on interpretations of Old Testament scripture.

Reception 

AllMusic has retrospectively praised the album, describing it as "compelling but brutal. An ugly, brooding masterpiece."

Track listing

Personnel

Diamanda Galás – vocals, co-producer
Production and additional personnel
T.J. Eng – photography
Frank Harris – engineering (B1)
Naut Humon – engineering (B1)
Dave Hunt – production, engineering (A1), mixing (B1)
Richard Zvonar – engineering (B1)

Release history

References

External links 
 

Diamanda Galás albums
1986 albums
Mute Records albums